"Play on Love" is a 1975 song by Jefferson Starship. It was the second of two singles issued from their Red Octopus LP. 

The song reached number 49 on the U.S. Billboard Hot 100 and number 47 on Cash Box during January 1976.  In Canada, "Play on Love" spent two weeks at number 46.

Cash Box said it was "one of the strongest cuts out of the Red Octopus album," and Grace Slick belts an easy enough melody for kids to pick up on with a terrific hook, 'play on love.'"  Record World called it a "choice album track with Grace taking the lead vocal and maneuvering the Starship to still higher plateaus."

Chart history

References

External links
 

Jefferson Starship songs
1975 songs
1975 singles
Songs written by Grace Slick
RCA Records singles